East Midwood Jewish Center is a Conservative synagogue located at 1625 Ocean Avenue, Midwood, Brooklyn, New York City.

Organized in 1924, the congregation's Renaissance revival building (completed in 1929) typified the large multi-purpose synagogue centers being built at the time, and was from the 1990s until 2010 the only synagogue with a working swimming pool in Brooklyn. The building has been unmodified architecturally since its construction, and in 2006 was added to the National Register of Historic Places (NRHP).

Membership dropped during the Great Depression, and the synagogue suffered financial hardship, but it recovered, and by 1941 had 1,100 member families. In 1950 the congregation built an adjoining school; at its peak its enrollment was almost 1,000. As neighborhood demographics changed in the late 20th century, and Brooklyn's Jewish population became more Orthodox, the East Midwood Jewish Center absorbed three other Conservative Brooklyn congregations.

The East Midwood Jewish Center had only three rabbis from its founding until 2014. Reuben Kaufman served from 1924 to 1929, Harry Halpern from 1929 to 1977 and Alvin Kass from 1976 to 2014. In 2014, Matt Carl became the rabbi.

History

Founding 
East Midwood was organized in 1924 by Jacob R. Schwartz, a dentist who was concerned that his two sons had no nearby Hebrew school which they could attend. From the start his intention had been to create a Conservative synagogue: Conservative Judaism was seen as a compromise between Orthodox and Reform, providing the familiar (and lengthy) Hebrew services of Orthodox Judaism, but, like Reform, adding some English prayers. East Midwood differed from earlier Ashkenazi synagogues in New York, as services were to be conducted in Hebrew and English only (not Hebrew and Yiddish), and the members were to come from immigrants from all over Europe, not just one city or region.

East Midwood held its first annual meeting on November 18, 1924 at the Jewish Communal Center of Flatbush (also known as the Flatbush Jewish Center), and there elected its first president, Pincus Weinberg. Weinberg, who was also chair of the Real Estate Committee, was the father of Sidney Weinberg, who rose from the job of assistant porter to head Goldman Sachs from 1930 to 1969. Prior to moving to Flatbush, Pincus Weinberg had been president of Congregation Baith Israel Anshei Emes.

East Midwood's first rabbi was Reuben Kaufman, and its first cantor was Jacob Schraeter. Kaufman, a Brooklyn native, had celebrated his bar mitzvah at Baith Israel Anshei Emes.

Building construction 
The Real Estate Committee almost immediately purchased land located on Avenue L between East 26th and 27th Streets. Most members, however, felt a location on Ocean Avenue would be more desirable. Issues arose with developing the land on Avenue L, and in 1925 the Committee purchased the current location at 1625 Ocean Avenue in Midwood, Brooklyn. The cornerstone was laid in 1926, and, although not complete, the building was fully enclosed by the autumn, and High Holiday services were held there that year. The Center's Talmud Torah, which had been created in 1925 and held in a temporary structure, also moved into the new building.

Designed in the Renaissance revival style, the building was finally completed in 1929 at the cost of $1 million (today $). It typified the new "synagogue-centers" being built at that time, combining the functions of both a synagogue and community center, and included "a synagogue, auditorium, kitchens, restaurant, classrooms, gymnasium, and swimming pool". That year Kaufman left the Center to become the rabbi of Temple Emanu-El in Paterson, New Jersey, and Harry Halpern became East Midwood's rabbi. Halpern, who also became an adjunct professor of pastoral psychiatry at the Jewish Theological Seminary of America (JTSA), would go on to serve as rabbi for 49 years, until his retirement in 1977, four years before his death in 1981.

Great Depression and mid-20th century 

The Great Depression took its toll on the congregation, and membership dropped. In order to cope with the financial burdens, dues were raised, teachers were given endorsed notes rather than paychecks, the Executive Secretary was laid off, pews were sold, and individual members provided mortgage guarantees. The synagogue survived, and membership recovered; by 1934 there were 300 members, and by 1944 there were 1,100.

Joseph Eidelson [Jozef Ajdelson] became cantor in 1956. Born in Warsaw, Poland, Eidelson previously served as cantor at Warsaw's Sinai Synagogue, and in 1935 at the Great Synagogue of Vilna, Lithuania.

In October 1968, then Mayor of New York City John Lindsay was booed and jeered by a huge crowd at the East Midwood Jewish Center, in an infamous incident during the 1968 New York City teachers strike. Lindsay had supported a school decentralization plan that had pitted mostly black parents against mostly Jewish teachers and school administration; after the administrator of the Ocean Hill—Brownsville school board dismissed 13 teachers and 6 administrators (mostly Jewish) for opposing decentralization, the United Federation of Teachers "called a strike that closed 85 percent of the city's 900 schools for 55 days".

When Lindsay arrived he was met by a mob of 2,000 people outside the synagogue, who shouted "Lindsay must go" and "we want Shanker". Halpern admonished the protesters, asking "Is this the exemplification of the Jewish faith?", but many replied "yes". Lindsay was heckled off the podium by the audience inside, and his limousine was "pounded on" and "pelted with trash" by the mob outside (which had grown to 5,000) as he drove away. The strike, which was marked by "threats of violence and diatribes laced with racism and anti-Semitism", ended when the New York legislature suspended the administrator and the board.

Following Halpern's retirement in 1977, East Midwood hired as rabbi Alvin Kass, a graduate of Columbia College and the JTSA, with a Ph.D. in philosophy from New York University.

Late 20th and early 21st century 
As Brooklyn's changing demographics made non-Orthodox institutions less viable, East Midwood absorbed three other congregations, including the Jewish Communal Center of Flatbush, where East Midwood had held its first annual meeting, and, in 1978, Flatbush's Congregation Shaare Torah. In 1996, membership was 1,000 families.

At that time the membership had become divided over the issue of role of women in the synagogue. Though some members left the congregation over this issue, by 2009 East Midwood had become fully egalitarian. According to then-Vice President Michael Sucher "Those individuals who championed depriving women of the rights to be full members of the congregation were overruled by a majority of members who wanted to have an egalitarian Conservative congregation".

The synagogue building has remained architecturally unchanged since its construction, and was from the 1990s until 2010 the only synagogue in Brooklyn with a functioning swimming pool. In June 2006, it was added to the NRHP. That year the congregation received a $300,000 loan from the New York Landmarks Conservancy for repairs for "masonry and steel repairs on the side and rear facades." It also raised $40,000 in order to receive a 2:1 "matching grant" of $20,000 from the Conservancy, and completed the repair work in 2007. In November 2007 East Midwood was awarded a $409,575 New York State Environmental Protection Fund grant to "restore features of the sanctuary including stained glass windows, stained glass dome and skylight."

Aaron Pomerantz joined as associate rabbi in 1978. Born in Poland, he had escaped Europe after the outbreak of World War II, moving to Canada and then the United States. There he graduated from Manhattan's Washington Irving High School, and in 1952 received his rabbinic ordination from Yeshiva Rabbi Chaim Berlin. From 1948 he had served as ritual director and then rabbi of Congregation Shaare Torah, joining the East Midwood Jewish Center when the two congregations merged. He served until his death in May 2009.

Joseph Eidelson retired to become Cantor Emeritus in 1995, 9 years before his death in 2004.

Sam Levene became East Midwood's cantor in 2004. Born in Jerusalem and raised in Toronto, Levene was a graduate of the H.L. Miller Cantorial School and the JTSA's cantorial program.

Kass retired to become Rabbi Emeritus in 2014. During his tenure Kass, also served as a New York City Police Department chaplain for over 40 years, and had previously served as a United States Air Force chaplain for two years. At one point during his service as Police Department chaplain he and his family received months of 24-hour security after death threats, and at another he defused a hostage situation by providing the hostage taker with sandwiches from the Carnegie Deli. Kass, who teaches ethics at the Police Academy, was instrumental in getting Jewish police officers time off to observe the Sabbath. He also convinced the NYPD Shomrim Society (the fraternal organization of Jewish members of the New York City Police Department) to admit David Durk. Durk, along with the more famous Frank Serpico, had been the source of the allegations of police corruption that led to the formation of the Knapp Commission.

Matt Carl joined as rabbi in 2014. A graduate of Vassar College and the JTSA , he had previously served as rabbi of Battery Park Synagogue in Manhattan and Congregation Mount Sinai in Brooklyn.

East Midwood Day School
East Midwood Jewish Center ran a successful Talmud Torah for after school Jewish instruction. As a child in the 1940s, feminist author Susan Brownmiller attended it two afternoons a week. In 1950, the congregation built a three-story school building and a two-story bridge link between the school and synagogue. At its peak in the early 1950s the school had an enrollment of almost 1,000.

East Midwood subsequently created a Conservative Jewish day school, serving students from kindergarten to Grade 8, and also providing "afternoon religious instruction for public school students through high school" operated separately from the Talmud Torah. Author and talk show host Dennis Prager taught at the day school. It was later renamed the Rabbi Harry Halpern Day School, in honor of Rabbi Halpern.

Like the synagogue, the day school also suffered from Brooklyn's changing (and increasingly Orthodox) demographics; enrollment had dropped from 400 students to 99 by the early 21st century. Invigorated by a new principal, enrollment climbed to 160 by 2008, but the school was still not financially stable. In addition, the day school had become more independent in the 1990s, and its relationship with the synagogue deteriorated to that of a tenant to a landlord. As a result, some of the synagogue's board members wanted to evict the school and find a new tenant. In 2009 the synagogue and the school signed a new agreement to bring the two organizations closer again, under which the synagogue would absorb some of the school's costs, and the parents of school children would become members of the synagogue. According to the synagogue's website, however, in 2018 the day school "reorganized itself, and modified into a more orthodox tradition". The Talmud Torah continued to operate as a congregational school.

Architecture 

The East Midwood Jewish Center synagogue building's architect is uncertain. The design is officially credited to the Building Committee and Irving Warshaw, the construction superintendent. The architect's name is not recorded in synagogue records, nor on the building's dedicatory plaque. The Center's National Register of Historic Places (NRHP) nomination form, however, argues that the architect was Louis Abramson, based on visual evidence and one piece of written evidence.

Abramson was a leading architect of synagogue-centers at that time. He designed a number of New York examples, including the original synagogue-center, the Manhattan Jewish Center (1918), as well as the Brooklyn Jewish Center, the Flatbush Jewish Center, and the Ocean Parkway Jewish Center (all constructed in Brooklyn between 1920 and 1924). While the Flatbush Jewish Center has been completely remodeled, the Brooklyn and Ocean Parkway Jewish Centers are visually similar to the East Midwood Jewish Center, and the Brooklyn Jewish Center in particular has an identical layout. The written evidence consists of an entry in a souvenir journal commemorating the twentieth anniversary of the Flatbush Jewish Center, stating that Abramson drew East Midwood's plans. The NRHP nomination form speculates that Abramson drew the basic plans for the East Midwood Center, and that the Building Committee completed them, in order to save money.

Alternatively, Maurice Courland's 1957 obituary claims the East Midwood Jewish Center as his work. Courland also designed a number of synagogues and New York landmarks, including Brooklyn's Magen David Synagogue.

Famous members 
Famous congregational members have included Supreme Court Justice Ruth Bader Ginsburg, who was confirmed at East Midwood, rather than having her bat mitzvah there, because (at the time) Conservative Judaism did not have bat mitzvah ceremonies for girls (a fact Ginsberg could not understand). When Ginsberg was 13 she also had essays published in the synagogue's bulletin about Stephen S. Wise, and on prejudice and world unity following the Holocaust. Filmmaker Marc Levin was also a member; Levin's grandfather, Herman Levin, had been a president of the East Midwood Jewish Center, and had also helped found, and been a long-time lay-leader of, the Reconstructionist movement.

East Midwood has also had members who have died under tragic circumstances, including Jason Sekzer, who was killed in the September 11, 2001 attacks, and Danny Farkas, a New York police lieutenant and National Guard soldier who died while stationed in Kabul, Afghanistan.

Media appearances
In 2018 scenes from the television series The Marvelous Mrs. Maisel were filmed here.

References

Bibliography 

 

, Jewish Center of Kings Highway, United States Department of the Interior, National Park Service, NPS Form 10-900, OMB No. 1024-0018.

External links 

East Midwood Jewish Center website
Lipsyte, Robert. "COPING; Time to Build The Ark?", The New York Times, August 23, 1998.

1924 establishments in New York City
1929 establishments in New York City
Conservative synagogues in New York City
Midwood, Brooklyn
Properties of religious function on the National Register of Historic Places in Brooklyn
Jewish organizations established in 1924
Renaissance Revival architecture in New York (state)
Renaissance Revival synagogues
Synagogue buildings with domes
Synagogues completed in 1929
Synagogues in Brooklyn
Synagogues on the National Register of Historic Places in New York City